The Glidden–Ralston Community School District is a rural public school district based in Glidden, Iowa.  The district is mostly in Carroll County, with a smaller area in Greene County.  The district serves the towns of Glidden and Ralston, and the surrounding rural areas.
The district has shared a superintendent with Paton-Churdan Community School District since 2015. The school's mascot is the Wildcats. Their colors are blue and gold.

Schools
The district operates two schools, both in Glidden:
Glidden–Ralston Elementary School
Glidden–Ralston Jr-Sr High School

Glidden–Ralston High School

Athletics
The Wildcats compete in the Rolling Valley Conference in the following sports:

Baseball
Basketball
Cross country
Football
 Two-time state champions - (1975 - Class 1A, 2005 - 8-man)
Golf 
Soccer 
Swimming
Softball
Track and field
 Boys' 1962 Class B state champions
Trap shooting
Volleyball
Wrestling

See also
List of school districts in Iowa
List of high schools in Iowa

References

External links
 Glidden-Ralston Community School District

Education in Greene County, Iowa
Education in Carroll County, Iowa
School districts in Iowa